Fluidra S.A. (FDR: SM), is a pool manufacturer. It is currently part of the IBEX 35, the benchmark index of the Spanish Stock Exchange.

History
Fluidra was founded in 1969 in Barcelona, Spain by four families (Planes, Serra, Corbera and Garrigós) creating the first company Astral Construcciones Metálicas.  Over the years, Fluidra has become an international company with nowadays around 7,000 employees working in production centres and sales offices located in more than 45 countries in Europe, North America, Australia, Asia and Africa.

Fluidra's executive president is Eloi Planes and the CEO is Bruce Brooks.

The company went public on the Spanish stock exchange in 2007.

In November 2017 Fluidra announced its merger with the Zodiac, which would be completed in July 2018.

At the end of 2021, Fluidra's turnover reached 2.2 billion euros with an EBITDA margin of 25%.

In March 2021 Fluidra was included in the IBEX 35.

Business lines 
Fluidra works in the pool and wellness sector, manufacturing and distributing equipment to build, upgrade and maintain a swimming pool, i.e. filtration, pumping, disinfection and water treatment, LED lighting, heating, cladding, as well as ornamental elements, together with connected applications (APPs) that allow remote control of the installation.

References

1969 establishments in Spain
IBEX 35
Companies based in Barcelona
Spanish brands